Captain the Honourable Reginald Berkeley Cole (26 November 1882 - 27 April 1925) was a prominent Anglo-Irish aristocrat, soldier, and white settler in Kenya. He is notable as the founder of the Muthaiga Club in Nairobi.

Biography
Cole was born in Northwich, England, the youngest child of Viscount Cole and his wife Charlotte Baird.

He was commissioned into the Royal Sussex Regiment as a second lieutenant on 23 February 1901, during the Second Boer War, and transferred to the 9th Lancers on 19 October. After the war, along with his brother Galbraith, he settled in Kenya. Their sister Florence had in 1899 married Lord Delamere, the pioneer of European settlement in Kenya.

On 18th September 1914, he was promoted to the temporary rank of captain while serving in the East African Campaign of the First World War. He led an irregular unit known as Cole's Scouts, formed of Somali soldiers and soldiers from the 2nd Battalion Loyal Regiment (North Lancashire). The unit was plagued by ill-discipline and friction with regular officers from the Lancashires, and was disbanded in August 1915. 

In 1920 he was elected as a Member of the Kenyan Legislative Council and he was re-elected unopposed in 1924.

He was a charismatic figure amongst the early European settlers in Kenya and a close friend of Karen Blixen who later featured him and their mutual friend Denys Finch Hatton in her memoir Out of Africa. He was notable as the founder of the Muthaiga Club, a private Nairobi enclave of the colony's demi-monde.

Death
He died of heart failure at Naro Moru on 27 April 1925 aged 42.

References

1882 births
1925 deaths
Settlers of Kenya
Members of the Legislative Council of Kenya
British Kenya people